The Whores is a 1994 Italian drama film directed by Aurelio Grimaldi. It was entered into the 1994 Cannes Film Festival.

Plot
Liuccia and Blu Blu "beat" on the street; Veronica and Minuccia practice in a clandestine brothel, Orlanda at her home; Maurizio has as a client a wealthy mature man (whom he will kill); the trans Kim advertises herself through newspaper ads. Their lives, their profession, the relationships with their customers, the inconveniences, the dramas.

Cast
 Ida Di Benedetto as Orlanda
 Luigi Maria Burruano as Mario
 Adriano Chiaramida as Wealthy man
 Vincenzo Crivello as Santino
 Guia Jelo as Liuccia Bonuccia
 Marco Leonardi as Maurizio
 Maurizio Nicolosi as Maurizio u Catanisi
 Paola Pace as Veronica
 Alessandra Di Sanzo as Kim
 Lucia Sardo as Milu
 Sandra Sindoni as Blu Blu
 Salvatore Termini as Waiter
 Alfredo Li Bassi as Thug

References

External links

1994 films
Films set in Sicily
Sicilian-language films
1990s Italian-language films
1994 drama films
Films directed by Aurelio Grimaldi
Italian black-and-white films
Italian drama films
1990s Italian films